Dohula  (also written Duhola or Dohla, ; , also known in Arabic as Qadisiyah) is a village located in the Sinjar District of the Ninawa Governorate in northern Iraq. The village is located north of the Sinjar Mount. It belongs to the disputed territories of Northern Iraq. It is populated by Yazidis.

References

Populated places in Nineveh Governorate
Yazidi populated places in Iraq